David Warren Lesch is a lecturer, author and commentator on Middle East history and politics. He is the Ewing Halsell Distinguished Professor of Middle East History at Trinity University in San Antonio, Texas. Lesch  writes regularly for news publications and journals, and has regularly appeared on radio and television discussing Middle East politics, and particularly, Syria. He co-founded (with William Ury), organized and led the Harvard-NUPI-Trinity Syria Research Project in 2012–1013, funded by the governments of Norway and Switzerland, with the Final Report published by NUPI in 2013.  He co-founded what in essence is the 2nd phase of this project in early 2014, along with Gerard McHugh, the founder and president of Conflict Dynamics International (CDI), based in Cambridge, MA.  This 2nd phase is entitled the CDI-Trinity University Syria Initiative, and it is ongoing and funded by the government of Denmark.  Both Syria projects have attempted to offer a better multi-dimensional understanding of the Syrian civil war as well as chart out possible pathways toward conflict resolution and sustainable governance.  Dr. Lesch was also the number one draft pick of the Los Angeles Dodgers in the 1980 baseball winter draft as a pitcher.

Education 
Lesch earned his Bachelor of Arts degree from the University of Maryland, Baltimore County and his M.A. and Ph.D. in History and Middle Eastern Studies from Harvard University.

Books 
 Syria and the United States: Eisenhower's Cold War in the Middle East (Westview Press, 1992)
 1979:  The Year that Shaped the Modern Middle East (Westview Press, 2001)
 History in Dispute: The Middle East Since 1945, Volumes 14 and 15 (St. James Press, 2003)
 The Middle East and the United States: A Historical and Political Reassessment (editor, Westview Press, 1996, 1999, 2003, 4th edition, 2006)
 The New Lion of Damascus: Bashar al-Asad and Modern Syria (Yale University Press, 2005)
 The Arab-Israeli Conflict: A History With Documents (Oxford University Press, 2006, 2nd edition 2019)
 Syrian Foreign Policy and the United States: From Bush to Obama (co-author) (Lynne Rienner Publishers, 2009)
 The Middle East and the United States: History, Politics and Ideology (co-editor with Mark Haas) (Westview Press, 2011, 2013, Routledge, 2018)
 Syria: The Fall of the House of Assad (Yale University Press, 2012, updated and in paperback 2013)
 Historical Dictionary of Syria (co-author with David Commins) (Scarecrow Press, 2012)
 "The Arab Spring: Change and Resistance in the Middle East (Volume 1, Westview Press, 2013) co-editor with Mark Haas
 "The Arab Spring: The Hope and Reality of the Uprisings (Volume 2, Routledge, 2017) co-editor with Mark Haas
 "Syria: A Modern History" (Polity Press, 2019)
 "A History of the Middle East Since the Rise of Islam (Oxford University Press, 2023)

Public Profile 
Lesch  has been asked to appear and discuss Syria and the Middle East on several US radio and television programs, including CNN, MSNBC and CNBC. He has also had opinion pieces in The Financial Times, The New York Times and The Washington Post, among others.

He  has travelled frequently to the Middle East on academic, business and diplomatic missions, and was president of Middle East International Business Associates, Inc., a consulting firm that investigated business opportunities in the Middle East for US companies.

In 2004 David Lesch began having regular contact with personal friend Syrian President Bashar al-Assad, and has since consulted with US government officials in their attempts to improve relations between the US and Syria.

In May 2008, Dr. Lesch was recognized by Trinity for his outstanding research.

Lesch  was also the number one draft pick of the LA Dodgers in 1980 as a pitcher.

References 

Trinity University (Texas) faculty
Harvard University alumni
University of Maryland, Baltimore County alumni
Living people
Year of birth missing (living people)
Place of birth missing (living people)